In art history, a namepiece is an artwork after which an otherwise unnamed artist is named. There is a long history of giving notnames to artists whose identity has been lost.

The Master of the Life of the Virgin (active c. 1463 to c. 1490) and the Master of the Legend of the Magdalen (active c. 1483 – c. 1527) both named after scenes from the Life of the Virgin attributed to them, the Master of the Prado Adoration of the Magi (active c. 1475 – 1500) named after his most famous panel, and the Vienna Master of Mary of Burgundy (c 1470 – c 1480), named after a manuscript owned by one of his patrons. The Berlin Painter (active c. 490s-c. 460s BCE) was named by Sir John Beazley for a large lidded amphora in the Antikensammlung Berlin, the Berlin Painter's namepiece. Some more examples include:

See also
List of anonymous masters
Notname

References

Visual arts